List of films produced in the Cinema of Poland before 1930.

External links
 Polish film at the Internet Movie Database

1929